The National College Lacrosse League is a men's lacrosse league comprising mostly Eastern United States college lacrosse clubs (non-varsity). The NCLL is recognized by US Lacrosse as one of the three primary areas of collegiate lacrosse; the others being the National Collegiate Athletic Association and the Men's Collegiate Lacrosse Association.

Founded in 1990, the NCLL is considered the premier college club lacrosse league for schools at which NCAA Division I varsity lacrosse exists. The NCLL also places a large focus on success in the classroom, with teams such as Princeton University, the U.S. Naval Academy, Penn State University, and Duke University, among others enforcing high academic standards that must be met in order to play.

The NCLL is structured in a division system, split into a Division I and Division II. Between both Divisions, the NCLL fields over 100 teams among ten conferences. Many of the clubs are at schools that currently have varsity NCAA men's lacrosse programs. Teams compete for the Frederick Cup, the national championship for their respective division, on the first weekend of May.

Current teams

Former teams

External links
 

College club sports associations in the United States
College lacrosse leagues in the United States